is a Japanese politician and member of the House of Representatives in the Diet (national legislature). A native of Okayama Prefecture and graduate of the University of Tokyo, he joined the Ministry of International Trade and Industry in 1979, attending the Center for International Affairs at Harvard University in the United States while in the ministry. Leaving the government in 1998, he ran unsuccessfully for the House of Representatives in 2000 as a member of the Liberal Democratic Party. He ran again in 2002 as an independent, and was elected for the first time. He lost his seat in 2003, but was re-elected in 2005.

He was a member of Your Party from its foundation in 2009 to 2013. On August 7, 2013, he was demoted from the secretary-general by party leader Yoshimi Watanabe due to disagreements in political policies. He left Your Party on December 9, 2013, along with thirteen other members, and announced the formation of a new party known as the Unity Party. He stated that his goal was to "change Japan by abolishing bureaucracy-led politics, fighting vested interests and breaking the centralization of power." Your Party challenged Eda's withdrawal by ordering the resignation of the defectors.

In 2014 he joined the Japan Innovation Party, which merged with other parties to create the Democratic Party in early 2016.

He is currently a member of the Constitutional Democratic Party of Japan (CDP).

References

External links

  

People from Okayama Prefecture
Members of the House of Representatives (Japan)
University of Tokyo alumni
Harvard University alumni
1956 births
Living people
Liberal Democratic Party (Japan) politicians
Your Party politicians
Unity Party (Japan) politicians
Japan Innovation Party politicians
Democratic Party (Japan, 2016) politicians
Constitutional Democratic Party of Japan politicians
21st-century Japanese politicians